Schelby Jean-Baptiste is a Haitian Canadian actress. She is most noted for her performance in the 2015 film Scratch, for which she was a nominee for Best Supporting Actress at the 18th Quebec Cinema Awards in 2016.

She has also appeared in the films Speak Love, There Are No False Undertakings (Il n'y a pas de faux métier), The Greatest Country in the World (Le meilleur pays du monde), This House (Cette maison) and No Ghost in the Morgue, and the television series Trauma, Unité 9, The Wall and Je voudrais qu'on m'efface.

References

External links

21st-century Canadian actresses
Canadian film actresses
Canadian television actresses
Black Canadian actresses
Canadian people of Haitian descent
Actresses from Quebec
Living people
Year of birth missing (living people)